St. John's Orthodox Syrian Church, Kanniattunirappu Palli is a  Malankara Orthodox Syrian Church founded on 20 May 1872.  The church is located on the Chottanikkara Vandippetta Road within the village of Thiruvaniyoor, in the Indian state of Kerala.
The St. John's Orthodox Syrian Church, Kanniattunirappu is founded on 20 May 1872.  The church is located on the Chottanikkara Vandippetta Road within the village of Thiruvaniyoor, in the Indian state of Kerala.
−	
The great church, St. John's Orthodox Syrian Church, Kanniattunirappu, popularly known as kanniattunirappu palli, is a parish under the Kandanadu(East) diocese of the Orthodox Syrian Christian Church. Even though it is one of the ancient church in this diocese, the present building was constructed in 1872. St. John's Orthodox Syrian Church is situated at very beautiful Kanniattunirappu kunnu, a village in the sylvan environment in the Kunnathunad Taluk of Ernakulam.
Website: kanniattunirappuchurch.org

External links

Churches in Ernakulam district
19th-century establishments in India
Churches completed in 1872
Malankara Orthodox Syrian church buildings
19th-century churches in India
19th-century Oriental Orthodox church buildings